LAS1-like protein is a protein that in humans is encoded by the LAS1L gene.

References

Further reading